The 1954 Arkansas Razorbacks football team represented the University of Arkansas in the Southwest Conference (SWC) during the 1954 college football season. In their second and final year under head coach Bowden Wyatt, the Razorbacks compiled an 8–3 record (5–1 against SWC opponents), won the SWC championship, and outscored all opponents by a combined total of 195 to 104.

With only 25 players on the team, this squad became known as the "25 Little Pigs." This fact makes it all the more amazing that they won the Southwest Conference championship.

Schedule

Game summaries

Mississippi

    

This contest had been designated as a Southeastern Conference game because Ole Miss had not scheduled required six conference games to be eligible for SEC title.

Cotton Bowl

References

Arkansas
Arkansas Razorbacks football seasons
Southwest Conference football champion seasons
Arkansas Razorbacks football